The Regions Tower (Regions Bank), formerly AmSouth Tower and before that the Commercial National Bank tower, is a high-rise in Shreveport, Louisiana in the United States. It was built in 1986 as the CNB Tower, adjacent to the bank's older building and connected to it by a common lobby. It is currently owned by Plaza Investments II, LLC and managed by Sealy & Company, Inc. of Shreveport. Facilities include a café and concessions, a shoe shine service, and a fitness facility for tenants only. It also includes a conference facility that seats up to 200.

References 
https://www.emporis.com/buildings/124936/regions-tower-shreveport-la-usa

Skyscrapers in Louisiana
Buildings and structures in Shreveport, Louisiana
Regions Financial Corporation
Skyscraper office buildings in Louisiana
Office buildings completed in 1986
HKS, Inc. buildings
1986 establishments in Louisiana